The third season of the American television series Person of Interest premiered on September 24, 2013. The season is produced by Kilter Films, Bad Robot Productions, and Warner Bros. Television, with Jonathan Nolan, Greg Plageman, J. J. Abrams, and Bryan Burk serving as executive producers and Plageman serving as showrunner. 

The series was renewed for a third season in March 2013 and stars Jim Caviezel, Taraji P. Henson, Kevin Chapman, Amy Acker, Sarah Shahi and Michael Emerson. The series revolves around a team led by a mysterious reclusive billionaire computer programmer, Harold Finch, who has developed a computer program for the federal government known as "the Machine" that is capable of collating all sources of information to predict terrorist acts and to identify people planning them. The Machine also identifies perpetrators and victims of other premeditated deadly crimes; however, because the government considers these "irrelevant", Finch programs the Machine to delete this information each night and programs the Machine to notify him secretly of the "irrelevant" numbers.

The season premiered on September 24, 2013 on CBS and ended on May 13, 2014. Viewership for the season averaged 14.05 million viewers, ranking as the 8th most watched series of the 2013-14 television season. The season received highly positive reviews from critics, its focus on artificial intelligence was singled out for praise and the surprise twists on the season also received acclaim. The season, which aired shortly after events associated with Edward Snowden, attracted more attention due to its similarities. In March 2014, CBS renewed the series for a fourth season.

Season summary
The Machine's sentience is fully revealed as it increasingly communicates with and proactively assists and directs the actions of the team. After being demoted due to HR's machinations, Carter delves deeper into her investigation of the organization and eventually uncovers and arrests its leader, thus bringing down the entire organization, but she is then killed by its rogue second-in-command. In his grief over her death, Reese briefly leaves the team. The team also battles Vigilance, a violent anti-government hacktivist organization devoted to securing people's privacy. 

During the second half of the third season, the existence of code to create another artificial intelligence – called Samaritan – is revealed, which has fallen into Decima's hands. Samaritan differs from the Machine in being open to external direction and willing to remove those seen as disruptive to law and order pre-emptively, and is a more advanced design, but as seen by the Machine, should never have existed as it lacks a moral code – an attribute that Samaritan sees as a flaw. In the season three finale, it is revealed that Greer, who sees Samaritan as a means to fix humanity's problems, had covertly built Vigilance as a domestic terrorist threat, and created a terrorist event of mass destruction in their name, to manipulate the authorities into ordering Samaritan's activation and providing direct access to the NSA feeds required for full operation. Unable to prevent Samaritan's activation, the Machine creates new identities for the Team while Root and Shaw modify Samaritan to always treat the new identities as unsuspicious.

Cast and characters

Main
 Jim Caviezel as John Reese
 Taraji P. Henson as Joss Carter
 Kevin Chapman as Lionel Fusco
 Amy Acker as Samantha Groves/Root
 Sarah Shahi as Sameen Shaw
 Michael Emerson as Harold Finch

Recurring 
 John Nolan as John Greer
 Leslie Odom Jr. as Peter Collier
 Robert John Burke as Patrick Simmons
 Camryn Manheim as Control
 Boris McGiver as Robert Hersh
 John Doman as Ross Garrison
 Clarke Peters as Alonzo Quinn
 Brian Wiles as Mike Laskey
 Enrico Colantoni as Carl Elias
 Al Sapienza as Raymond Terney
 David Valcin as Anthony S. Marconi/Scarface
 Laz Alonso as Paul Carter
 Bruce Altman as Dr. Ronald Carmichael
 Kwoade Cross as Taylor Carter
 Michael Esper as Jason Greenfield
 Joe Mazzello as Daniel Casey
 Saul Rubinek as Arthur Claypool
 Alex Shimizu as Tatsuro Daizo
 Morgan Spector as Peter Yogorov
 Julian Ovenden as Jeremy Lambert
 Sean McCarthy as Lee Fusco
 Annie Parisse as Kara Stanton
 Carrie Preston as Grace Hendricks
 Jay O. Sanders as Special Counsel
 Paige Turco as Zoe Morgan

Notable guests
 Rey Valentin as Jack Salazar
 Max Martini as RIP
 David Alan Basche as Wayne Kruger
 Warren Kole as Ian Murphy
 Paul Ben-Victor as Detective Cameron
 Daniel Cosgrove as Jeremy Watkins
 Kirk Acevedo as Timothy Sloan
 Aaron Staton as Hayden Price
 Lee Tergesen as Detective Petersen
 Sally Pressman as Holly
 Samm Levine as Owen Matthews
 Neil Jackson as Rick Dillinger
 Yul Vazquez as Cyrus Wells
 Colin Donnell as Billy Parsons
 Nazneen Contractor as Maria Martinez
 Haaz Sleiman as Omar Risha
 Michel Gill as Rene Lapointe
 Nestor Carbonell as Matthew Reed
 John Heard as Roger McCourt

Episodes

Production

Development
The series was renewed for a third season in March 2013. Jonathan Nolan stated that he viewed the season as two halves: the first half focusing on Carter's journey and the second half focusing more on the Machine storyline. Nolan commented on the 22-episode season order, "It's very difficult. The number of episodes is probably calibrated not to the length of the season but to the exact point a showrunner will have a nervous breakdown."

Writing

Greg Plageman said that the Machine's location is not the central theme of the season, but what its intentions are, "What is it up to? What sort of organism is it becoming? And is it expanding beyond the parameters of what even Finch designed?"

Amy Acker teased her role in the season, "The Machine and Root have a very special connection — at least in her mind. So it's either perpetuating her fantasies by calling her or something else." She also addressed more scenes with Shaw, saying, "She's so great, I would love to torture her again any day." Plageman added that the season would explore mostly Carter and Shaw's pasts. On Shaw's role, Plageman deemed her part of the "Groucho Marx School", explaining that she wouldn't work for anyone following her government's betrayal but she would help the team "when she feels like it." Sarah Shahi commented on her character's past on "Razgovor", "as we were shooting it, I felt like it was a complete and total disaster and I had no idea how it was going to turn out. But then after watching it I was very pleased with it."

Many analysts noticed similarities between the season's airing and Edward Snowden, whose actions drew parallelisms to the series' premise, particularly to an episode in the first season, "No Good Deed". Nolan commented, "Occasionally, we've been accused of writing a show that's sort of an apologia for the surveillance state. I totally reject that. If there's a cynicism to the show, it's in the premise not just that this is inevitable but that it's already happened. The science-fiction part of the show is that the Machine is accurate, but the invasion of civil liberties is not imaginary. If the legacy of the Second World War was the atomic age, then what might emerge from the war on terror would be artificial intelligence." Plageman said, "What's interesting about the revelations coming from Snowden is that there are other characters, other figures — some who work for the FBI or the NSA — who indicated years ago that this was something that was going on. Certainly Shane Harris outlined all this in his book The Watchers, going back as far as Admiral Poindexter, so what we'd like to do this year is inform people how long this has actually been going on, through drama and through fiction, but in a way that is actually quite real." Actor Kevin Chapman said, "Look at the NSA — they're making us look like a reality show! We've been talking about that for three seasons, and it's now just coming to light."

Casting

A few days after the second season ended, it was announced that Sarah Shahi, who played Sameen Shaw, would be upgraded to series regular starting with this season. In July 2013, it was reported that Amy Acker was also upgraded to series regular for the season. Nolan commented on the decision to upgrade both stars, "when you add a few new characters, that actually winds up adding five or six new relationships. It gives us that much more of a challenge, which is great fun."

The season brough back many actors from the series, including Paige Turco as Zoe Morgan, who reprised her role on "Lady Killer".

"The Crossing" features the death of Joss Carter, played by Taraji P. Henson. During rumors of a main character death, recurring cast member Carrie Preston teased the death, "It's going to be sad for everybody — not just the fans but also the cast. But I think the way [the show] is handling it is quite remarkable." Nolan told Henson about her death at the beginning of 2013, indicating, "It was a bittersweet conversation, because we love working with her and vice versa. It's been a great creative collaboration. As sad as we were to see her go, I think we were all excited [Taraji, us and the writers] to get into a juicy piece of material, to tell a tragedy." He went on to explain the decision, "For this story [HR, police corruption] it was a natural boiling point that would put her first and foremost into focus. And frankly, as writers, we've long said that Carter was the heart of the show, and your perverse impulse as a writer is to do as much damage to the audience as possible. There's nothing more dastardly than — if Carter's the heart of the show — breaking that heart for the audience in the middle of the season." Executive producer Greg Plageman also commented on the decision, "What felt natural to us was with HR being with us from the pilot, their diabolical no-goodness, it felt like they had it in for Carter... it got to a point where you think if this person is going to hold her head up and walk into a precinct ever again she's going to have to take them on and in the conversations she had with her son, it was kind of understood what she had to do and it felt like the time was right." The kiss scene between Reese and Carter was unscripted, with Nolan commenting, "It was just a swapping scars moment. So when the actors went there, it was all of their own volition, because in that moment they both felt it. And when you removed that element, the scene didn't feel quite the same."

Among the many guest stars in the season include Warren Kole as Ian Murphy, "a POI whom Detective Carter, Agent Shaw and Zoe Morgan each try to catch the eye of — by any dressed-to-kill means necessary." For the first episode, Rey Valentin was cast as Jack Salazar, "a sailor on shore leave — during Fleet Week in New York City." The fourth episode guest starred Kathleen Rose Perkins as Vanessa Watkins, "a former ADA who is captured by the police for murdering her defense attorney ex-husband." In November 2013, Saul Rubinek joined for a two-episode guest performance as Arthur Claypool, a character only described as "slowly losing his mind."

In July 2013, Leslie Odom Jr. joined the series in a recurring role as Peter Collier, "an educated, even-tempered tech executive. Highly analytical, he plays his cards close to the vest." In November 2013, Camryn Manheim joined the series as Diane, Arthur Claypool's wife. She debuted on "Lethe", where her character was revealed to be Control. The character was teased on "God Mode", where she was played unseen by an uncredited actress.

Release

Broadcast
In May 2013, CBS announced that the series would move from its Thursday time slot to Tuesdays at 10 p.m. Many deemed the move favorable for the series, as CBS wanted to create a second comedy block on Thursday night and considered that pairing the series with NCIS and NCIS: Los Angeles would work on its favor. In June 2013, CBS announced that the season would premiere on September 24, 2013. The season ended on May 13, 2014.

Marketing
On July 20, 2013, the cast and crew attended the 2013 San Diego Comic-Con to discuss and promote the season and show a sneak peek. The panel, which revealed that Amy Acker was upgraded to series regular, also included a short reel which included Finch commenting on the PRISM disclosure. In October 2013, the cast attended the 2013 Paley Fest and New York Comic-Con for a Q&A session and show a sneak peek of an upcoming episode.

As part of a stunt for the November sweeps, CBS promoted "Endgame", "The Crossing" and "The Devil's Share" as part of a "three-episode event", which was deemed as pivotal and would change the direction of the series. Nolan and Plageman teased the episodes, "We promised our actors and our audience that these characters wouldn't be static, stuck in an endless loop — that they would have a journey. And, of course, every journey comes to an end."

Home media release
The third season was released on Blu-ray and DVD in region 1 on September 2, 2014, in region 2 on September 21, 2015, and in region 4 on October 8, 2014.

In 2014, Warner Bros. Television Studios announced that it sold the off-network SVOD of the series to Netflix. On September 1, 2015, the season became available to stream on Netflix. On September 22, 2020, the series left the service and was added to HBO Max on January 23, 2021.

Reception

Viewers

Critical reception
The third season received highly positive reviews, and is noteworthy for drawing in more critics for its exploration of artificial intelligence, as well as its timely storytelling format. On Rotten Tomatoes, the season has an approval rating of 100% and average rating of 7.72 out of 10 based on 11 reviews. The site's critical consensus is, "Person of Interest weaves compelling standalone stories into its engrossing serial narrative, and incorporates welcome bursts of humor into its sci-fi mystery core."

In regards to the season, Slant Magazine said that the show "is at its best when sticking to cutting-edge topics" and called it a "solid action-thriller that intersperses twist-filled standalone episodes into its season-long arcs." The A.V. Club said that the show captures the "national post-post-9/11 mood" and that with the mid-season arc in season three, "turns conspiracy theory into art". 

The season's two story arcs both received a considerable amount of praise: the two episodes ending the HR storyline are commonly considered to be some of the best episodes of Person of Interest. Matt Fowler of IGN gave "The Crossing" a 10 out of 10, reacting extremely positively to the cliffhanger at the ending. The episode to follow, "The Devil's Share", was the most acclaimed episode of the season, being praised for its opening sequence, its writing, Chris Fisher's direction, and the acting performances, especially those by Jim Caviezel and Kevin Chapman. Surette called the episode a "stunner" and declared it as the series' possible best episode, praising the opening sequence as the "greatest sequence the series ever put together", feeling it succeeded in eclipsing the devastation induced by Carter's death. Surette also praised Fusco's effectiveness and character development in the episode, as well naming the cinematography and direction to be the best of the series, and identifying points of symbolism in the episode he felt were noteworthy and effective. Fowler gave the episode an "amazing" rating of a 9.3 out of 10, also praising the opening sequence, as well as the flashbacks and the ending scene. Phil Dyess-Nugent of The A.V. Club gave the episode a perfect A rating, praising the atmosphere of grief the episode built and feeling Fusco's character development served as an appropriate tribute to Carter. Sean McKenna of TV Fanatic called the opening sequence "brilliant", while Courtney Vaudreuil of TV Equals praised the ending.

References

External links 
 

Person of Interest seasons
2013 American television seasons
2014 American television seasons